Tarfayeh (also Romanized as Ţarfāyeh) is a village in Muran Rural District, in the Soveyseh District of Karun County, Khuzestan Province, Iran. At the 2006 census, its population was 732 in 140 families.

References 

Populated places in Karun County